is a Japanese actress.

Filmography

Hōzuki-san Chi no Aneki (2014)

References

External links
 Official agency profile 
 
 

1969 births
Japanese film actresses
People from Nagoya
Living people